Stanbrook Abbey is a Catholic contemplative Benedictine women's monastery with the status of an abbey, located at Wass, North Yorkshire, England. 

The community was founded in 1625 at Cambrai in Flanders (then part of the Spanish Netherlands, now in France), under the auspices of the English Benedictine Congregation. After being imprisoned during the French Revolution, the surviving nuns fled to England and in 1838 settled at Stanbrook, Callow End, Worcestershire, where a new abbey was built. The community left this to relocate to Wass in the North York Moors National Park in 2009; the Worcestershire property, as of 2020, was operated as a luxury hotel and events venue named Stanbrook Abbey Hotel.

History

Foundation
The future abbey was founded in 1623 at Cambrai as the monastery of "Our Lady of Consolation", catering for English Catholic expatriates. The project was initiated in 1621 by an English Benedictine (EBC) monk called Dom Benet Jones, who had been in contact with several interested young women in England while on mission duties there.

The nine original members were escorted by him from England to Cambrai (which the English then called Camerick), where they took over the ruined town-house of the defunct Benedictine abbey of Saint-Étienne-de-Fémy, restored it and moved in at the end of 1623. Since they were still laywomen they had to serve a noviciate, so three nuns from the English monastery at Brussels were lent to provide the formation. Two of them later joined the nascent community, including Dame Frances Gawen who served as the first superior. The monastery was only considered to have been formally founded when the noviciate was completed and the novices made vows, at the start of 1625.

The most notable among the foundresses was 17-year-old Helen More, professed as Dame Gertrude More, who was the great-great-granddaughter of St Thomas More; her father, Cresacre More, provided the original endowment for the foundation of the monastery. Solemnly professed Benedictine nuns of the English tradition use the honorific "Dame" in the same way that EBC monks are called "Dom"; they are not Dames Commander of the Order of the British Empire. In the same tradition, abbesses used to be referred to as "Lady" which echoed the noble status of abbots and abbesses in pre-Reformation England.

The English Benedictine mystical writer Dom Augustine Baker trained the young nuns in a tradition of contemplative prayer which survives to date.

The other eight foundresses were: Catherine Gascoigne, Grace and Ann More (cousins of Dame Gertrude), Anne Morgan, Margaret Vavasour, Frances Watsonthese were choir nuns; and two claustral or extern sisters, Mary Hoskins and Jane Martin. The latter were not bound to the Divine Office or to keep monastic enclosure, so were responsible for shopping and for routine contacts with the outside world.

Life at Cambrai
The first abbess was elected in 1629. Lady Abbess Catherine Gascoigne was to serve for forty years, being re-elected every four years as is the peculiar English Benedictine custom (Benedictine abbots and abbesses are traditionally elected for life) She had to obtain a papal dispensation when first elected, as at age twenty-eight she was below the statutory age of thirty. The community members were very young then.

A daughter house in Paris was founded in 1651, which became independent in 1656 and was eventually to become Colwich Abbey in England. The two communities were to come together again in 2020, 364 years later.

The nuns were in Cambrai for 170 years, but little is known of their history because of subsequent destruction of records. However, the community had a good reputation for strictness of observance and for keeping enclosure. One oddity was that they ran a small school for girls inside their enclosure, with the pupils being subject to the monastic routine. As well as school fees, the sisters did the traditional remunerative work of enclosed nuns which is fine needlework and embroidery, especially on vestments and liturgical textiles. One unusual source of income was from fine paperwork, which involved cutting sheets of paper into complicated patterns and figurative depictions for decorative purposes. The nuns also had active intellectual lives, for example in translating French spiritual writings into English. A good library was accumulated.

A report preserved in the city archives has this:

Despite the cramped site, the nuns had their own cemetery. Since they were under the authority of the Abbot President of the English Benedictine Congregation and not that of the bishop, they had no right of burial at the local parish church.

The nuns became French subjects in 1678 when Cambrai was annexed by France.

A memory of the monastery is preserved at Cambrai in the street name Rue des Anglaises, or "Englishwomen Street".

Imprisonment and exile
In 1793, during the French Revolution, the twenty-one nuns were arrested and evicted from their original monastery on 18 October, all their property being confiscated. They were taken to Compiègne and imprisoned there for eighteen months in the former Convent of the Visitation, during which time four of them died from the harsh conditions which included inadequate food and the presence of epidemic typhus. Among their fellow prisoners were the future Carmelite Martyrs of Compiègne. After petitioning to be allowed to go into exile in England, the seventeen survivors were released in April 1795 and put on a boat at Calais, which took them to Dover where they arrived destitute on 2 May. They were wearing lay clothes left behind by the Compiègne martyrs, which hence became second-class relics.

One of the nuns died in temporary lodgings at London.

Their monastery at Cambrai was looted and turned into a prison; it was subsequently demolished.

Nuns at Woolton
The community was taken under the care of the English Benedictine (EBC) monks in England, who sent them to the EBC mission at Woolton near Liverpool on 21 May. There they were given a domestic house, and a pre-existing girls' school to run. They were also told that they could not wear the religious habit - the EBC monks did not do so themselves back then. There were no English sumptuary law against the habit, as Blessed Dominic Barberi was the first to prove, but popular anti-Catholic hostility could have led to habited nuns being charged with breach of the peace.

The community occupied two houses, 45 and 47 Woolton Street, and later expanded into number 43. They initially had to depend on donations to survive, but the government granted the sixteen of them a generous pension of one and a half guineas (£1.575) per month for each nun, which gave the community an annual income of £302.40 (or £36,617 in 2020 values). Their small school, for girls aged five to thirteen, was a success and had eighteen pupils by 1807, each charged 18 guineas per annum (£18.90 , £2 289 in 2020 values).

As well as girls, the nuns taught a few little boys. One of these was to become a monk at Downside Abbey and later, as John Bede Polding, the first Roman Catholic archbishop of Sydney in Australia.

In 1807, the nuns decided to move. They had regarded themselves as refugees waiting to go home to Cambrai, but attempts to reclaim their property from the French government had proved futile. Meanwhile, four had died but seven had joined.

Nuns at Abbots Salford
An interim home was found in 1808 at Salford Hall, Abbot's Salford, Warwickshire which was a mansion built in 1602 by a recusant family, the Stanfords. Hence it contained a priest hole, and a public Catholic chapel fitted out in the early 18th century and served by EBC monks from 1727 until the end of the century.

The nuns took their school with them, but were able to resume wearing the habit and created a mitigated enclosure (they divided the chapel with a grille). However, the house was only lent to them and was not for purchase. So, the nuns bought a property for a purpose-built nunnery twenty-eight years later, in 1835.

The EBC monk chaplain at Salford Hall from 1822 until he died in 1830 was Dom Augustine Lawson, who was helpful in trying to find the community a permanent home. As he was dying he asked that his remains should accompany the nuns, so when they moved in 1838 he was disinterred and re-buried at their new home. His body was found to be incorrupt.

In the same year of 1830, the last Cambrai nun died.

Salford Hall is now a hotel and is a Grade I listed building.

Stanbrook construction phase 1
In 1835, with the encouragement and agency of the EBC monk Dom Bernard Short based at Little Malvern (later the abbey chaplain), the nuns bought Stanbrook Hall at Callow End in the parish of Powick,, near Malvern, Worcestershire in the Severn Valley. This was an unpretentious country mansion, built by an alderman of Worcester called Richard Case in 1755. He had purchased a pair of pre-existing smallholders' cottages at a locality called Stanbrook End and incorporated one of them into his construction 

The nuns decided not to live in the hall, but to keep it as the presbytery for their EBC priest-chaplain and his domestic servants. For their own residence, they employed as architect the county surveyor for Worcestershire, Charles Day who was brother to one of the nuns. He added a separate range abutting the west wing of the Hall, comprising two conjoined blocks one of which was for the nuns and the other for the school. The former contained a nuns' chapel, an extern chapel (for visitors) and a chapter room as well as domestic facilities, while the latter had two school rooms. This two-storey edifice in red brick was also unpretentious and had no traditional monastic features. It was finished in 1838 when the nuns moved in.

The nuns' chapel, although lacking a distinct structural identity, is significant in the architectural history of the period owing to its neo-classical style and the role of Baroque design influences on its interior. Day also designed St Francis Xavier Church at Hereford, St Edmund's Church at Bury St Edmunds and the Shire Hall, Worcester.

The original entrance to the new abbey precinct was to the south, on Upton Road, where a pair of semi-octagonal gate lodges survive and are Grade-II listed.

To the north of the Abbey and in its grounds, a house called the Hermitage was built 1865 for one Lady Henrietta Mary Crewe, who had obtained permission to live with the nuns as a corrodian but then changed her mind. The house that she built became the abbey's guest house, and later part of St Mary's House when guest facilities were expanded in the 20th century.

The northern part of the area between the Presbytery and Abbey was laid out as the nuns' graveyard, with Dom Augustine re-interred there.

The west wing of the Hall was still extant in 1885 but had been demolished by 1903.

Stanbrook construction phase 2

Proposal 1863

In 1863, the EBC monk Dom Laurence Shepherd was appointed as chaplain and served until his death in 1885. He helped the nuns to establish themselves as noted practitioners of Gregorian chant and imbued them with the ancient monastic liturgical tradition being revived by Dom Prosper Guéranger of Solesmes Abbey in France. He also aided them in revising their monastic Constitutions or practical rules of life in line with Guéranger's ideas. Most importantly, he encouraged the community to begin a project to build a complete new abbey from scratch, in plan echoing a high-status medieval monastery with a proper church and three ranges of buildings around a square cloister. The community was growing rapidly, as vocations to the religious life were plentiful at the time.

The basic plans for the scheme were drawn up by Dom Laurence himself with the assistance of Dom Hildebrand de Hemptinne, a Belgian Benedictine monk from Beuron Archabbey. The architectural work was entrusted to the family of the late Augustus Welby Pugin, which was based in Ramsgate. The elder son, Edward Welby Pugin, was responsible for the building of St Augustine's Abbey and the abbot there provided the recommendation. Work was to continue until the end of the century. Unfortunately, the project was then left unfinished.

Church 1869
The abbey church was the first to be begun, in 1869 during the term of office of Abbess Scholastica Gregson. The site was just to the north of the graveyard. The edifice was to the designs of Edward Welby Pugin, in Gothic Revival style, but his first design (for which a drawing survives) was too expensive at £4 200 and he was told to limit the cost to £3 000. Dom Laurence also insisted that a proposed large bell-turret over the west end had to be replaced by a traditional tall church tower with a clock and that the proposed open roof was to be provided with a ceiling vault for acoustic reasons (he was worried about the plainchant). Work was completed in 1871.

A set of human remains from a Roman catacomb, a virgin martyr given the name St Fulgentia, was enshrined under the high altar. 

Two ambulatories or covered corridors were built by the same architect to link the new church with the already existing buildings. The Presbytery was linked directly to the sanctuary of the church by one of these, while another ran north of the old Abbey to a stand-alone printing shop before turning east to the west tower entrance of the church. This latter section was fitted out as a Via Crucis (Way of the Cross), with sculpted Stations of the Cross.

East range 1878
Work on the three cloister ranges to the north of the church began in 1878, under the collaboration of Peter Paul Pugin, Cuthbert Welby Pugin and George Ashlin from Ireland. Abbess Gertrude d'Aurillac Dubois was in office. The east range, containing the main abbey entrance and the parlours, was finished by 1880. Only the basement of the north range, to contain the kitchen and refectory, was finished when work was then paused. A plan of the project, together with a drawing of the east range, was published in "The Architect" magazine in 1881.

Holy Thorn Chapel 1885
The Holy Thorn Chapel of 1885-86 was added to the south side of the church by Peter Paul Pugin, and made accessible to the public through the church's extern chapel. It was in the style of a medieval pilgrimage shrine, and housed the Holy Thorn, which was a relic of the crown of thorns from Glastonbury Abbey (not to be confused with the Glastonbury Thorn, which was a tree). Dom Laurence Shepherd was buried here in 1885 and Abbess Gertrude d'Aurillac Dubois in 1897, and both given sculptural tombs as being those responsible for the new abbey.

In the same year, Peter Paul Pugin blocked up the tower entrance of the church with a huge, monumental abbatial throne which dominated the choir and rivalled the high altar at the other end of the church.

North range 1895
The north range was resumed in 1895, and completed in 1898. The last addition to the main abbey buildings was the sacristy, in 1899. After this, the original mansion was referred to as the "Old House", its chapel became the abbey's chapter room and its refectory became the library. The original entrance driveway to the abbey, from the south, was blocked up and the pre-existing access to "The Hermitage" was utilised to lay out a new access way from the north.

Work abandoned 1900
Work on the grand project then ceased. The west range was not begun, which would have included a new chapter house, library and infirmary, and neither was a proposed school range which would have been a westward continuation of the north range. Another omission was an ambulatory from the proposed chapter house to the east range, forming the south side of the cloister.

Activities
Stanbrook Abbey has been celebrated for its traditions of Gregorian chant (otherwise known as plainchant), the publication of devotional literature and fine printing. The translations of the writings of St Teresa of Avila are still in print a century after their publication. The Stanbrook Abbey Press was at one time the oldest private press in England, and acquired an international reputation for fine printing under Dames Hildelith Cumming and Felicitas Corrigan. Although digital printing and publishing continues at the Abbey on a small scale, the fine letterpress printing which made the Press famous had ceased by 1990.

20th century
The community believed they were keeping papal enclosure from 1880 when they moved into their new quarters. However, the rules of papal enclosure are not compatible with running a school. The new abbey project had envisaged the school expanding in a proposed separate wing, but this would have split the community between those strictly enclosed and teaching externs. Hazel Hastings was one of the later pupils as her mother had become a nun. She said there were about twelve pupils who wore black habits and veils and the learnt liturgy, plainsong, Latin, calligraphy, heraldry, and astronomy. She left in about 1911. In 1918 the school (which had always been small) was closed.

In 1923, the nuns commissioned the  furniture maker Robert "Mouseman" Thompson  to fit out their refectory with tables, chairs, wall panelling, a crucifix and a huge pulpit for reading a book aloud during meals (a monastic tradition). These items feature his signature carved mouse. The tables and chairs were taken to Wass when the community moved.

In 1935, when the abbey was at the height of its career, the community numbered eighty-two. This total comprised fifty-two choir nuns, nineteen conversae, seven novices and four extern sisters. The 'conversae' or claustral sisters were not bound to the Divine Office and did the domestic and manual work, but stayed in the enclosure. The externs were the ones who ventured outside as necessary.

The community had two EBC monk-chaplains resident at the Presbytery. This was because Roman Catholic priests are not permitted routinely to celebrate more than one Mass a day, except if there is a shortage of priests. One priest celebrated the Sung High Mass (the full ceremonial form of the Tridentine Mass) which was the focus of the community's liturgical life, and the other celebrated a Low Mass in the extern chapel for local people, employees and those nuns who wished to receive Communion.

The height of Edward Pugin's grand Gothic high altar obscured the great rose window at the church's east end which contained stained glass in honour of Our Lady. As a result it was cut down in 1937, a project executed by Geoffrey Webb. The monstrance throne cavity was filled with a sculpture of Christ the King by Philip Lindsey Clark.

In 1950, the community was still flourishing and comprised around seventy, a number it kept for the next twenty years. This made it the biggest women's monastery in Britain. Around this time, the lush decorative wall stencilling in the church sanctuary, which included depictions of Christ and the saints, was partly painted over.

The failure to complete the new buildings left the abbey's facilities awkwardly spread between two adjacent but disjunct sites. Getting from one to the other was awkward in bad weather, so ambulatories in red brick occupying the missing two sides of the cloisters were designed by Martin Fisher in 1965. Historic England dismissed this work as "not considered to be of interest".

In that year of 1965, the community numbered seventy-one: forty-four choir nuns, eighteen conversae, three novices and six externs.

The church sanctuary was re-ordered in 1971 by Anthony Thompson, with the loss of the original Pugin fittings including the cut-down high altar and the surviving wall paintings. The former was replaced by a very plain free-standing altar in white stone, and a tabernacle stand in the same style. Also, the Minton encaustic floor tiles were taken up and replaced with plain ones (some of the removed tiles were stored, and later relaid in the church at Wass). The wrought iron rood screen was donated to Birmingham Art Gallery, and the altar in the extern chapel (dedicated to the Sacred Heart) was also removed.

The community was notable in the last third of the 20th century for setting liturgical texts in English to music in the plainchant tradition.

A growing public interest in the "monastic experience", to be enjoyed by staying as a guest in a monastery, led the nuns in this period to extend their guest facilities. The original 1865 Hermitage guest house was supplemented by a conversion of stables next door, and this became St Mary's House, which could accommodate eighteen guests of both sexes.

Relocation
The 1971 sanctuary re-fitting mentioned above was in the context of a revision of Roman Catholic liturgical practices after the Second Vatican Council, 1962-5. However vocations to the religious life began to decline in the UK as of 1966, and this drop became permanent. Monasteries which were used to having several novices, year on year, found themselves receiving none. Although the initial reaction tended to be to hold on to the optimism and "wait for better times", the substantial and persistent decrease in vocations meant that monastic institutions became less viable. Of the eleven Benedictine women's monasteries in England in 1950, seven have shut down, two have moved (including Stanbrook Abbey), and only two remain on their original sites (Ryde Abbey and Minster Abbey.

As of 2002 the community numbered twenty-eight professed nuns, also two postulants (the monastic term for those resident who are "thinking about a vocation"). The community had lost 60% of its membership in 25 years, and those left were ageing. About 120 lay people known as oblates (the Benedictine term for tertiaries) were affiliated with the monastery.

The community announced in April 2002 that it would be moving out. Abbess Joanna Jamieson made the announcement that the Abbey would move from its Victorian abbey, with its . of monastic buildings "to make the best use of its human and financial resources" (running the oil-fired central heating was costing £6000 a month). This was controversial because some argued that the preservation of the institution had to be the nuns' first priority rather than the welfare of the monastic community, and The Times newspaper  published the following letter on 23 January 2006:

Three nuns (one being Sister Catherine Wybourne, also known as 'Digitalnun') had left the community, and in September 2004 founded Holy Trinity Monastery at East Hendred in Oxfordshire. They moved to Wormbridge in Herefordshire in 2012, and are now (2020) known as Howton Grove Priory. They have received no vocations, were down to two in 2020, and with Wybourne's death in 2022 only one remains.

The Abbey looked at possible sites all over the country until it bought Crief Farm at Wass in the North York Moors National Park.  Construction of the new monastery began on 18 June 2007. The building work was to be completed in four distinct phases. The community moved into this new "Stanbrook Abbey" at Wass on 21 May 2009, after the first phase had been completed. The architects were Feilden Clegg Bradley Studios.

The monastic tradition is that, if a monastery moves, it takes the name of its new location. However, the Stanbrook community decided not to do this and so is Stanbrook Abbey, not Wass Abbey.

The cost of the first phase was £5 million.

After May 2009, the original abbey church was formally deconsecrated in preparation for the sale of the property. The relics of St Fulgentia were taken out of the altar when it was dismantled, and put into store until the new abbey church at Wass could be built.

Life at Wass

The old monastery was put on the market at £6 million in 2009, but only sold in August 2010 for £4.5 million. Phase 2, the building of a new church, could then be entered into and was completed in 2015. This cost £2.5 million.

The relics of St Fulgentia were enshrined under the new altar.

The resulting set of new abbey buildings, by Feilden Clegg Bradley Studios, were given a RIBA National Award in 2016.

Phase 3, the construction of a new library, and phase 4, an expansion of the guest accommodation, were not begun by 2020.

In 2019 with the closure of Oulton Abbey as a monastery, the last two remaining nuns affiliated to Stanbrook Abbey (just as, in 2002, Oulton received some members of the closed Fernham Priory which used to be Princethorpe Priory). One went to live there, the other was caretaking the Oulton property pro tem.

In 2020 the community numbered nineteen, including one oblate not in vows but sharing the life in all respects. The Abbey is now only the second largest Benedictine women's monastery in England, as Ryde Abbey has twenty-eight.

In the same year, Colwich Abbey was similarly dissolved and its nuns transferred. This monastery had originally been a daughter house in Paris, which was founded from Cambrai in 1651 and which became independent in 1656. The two communities were to come together again 364 years later, as the two remaining able-bodied nuns at Colwich went to live at Wass.

Stanbrook Abbey Hotel

In August 2010, the Grade II-listed Worcestershire property was sold to Clarenco LLP to be converted into an events venue and luxury hotel called the Stanbrook Abbey Hotel. The nuns had been neglecting necessary maintenance for half a century, and so the property was affected by leaky roofs and dry rot. Hence, they received only three-quarters of the £6 million that they were expecting to raise on sale.

The company erected an impressive entrance gateway west of the unassuming original one, laid out car parks and began to convert ranges of nuns' cells with no plumbing into en-suite bedrooms. The grave markers on the nuns' graves were removed to allow the layout of a lavender garden on the graveyard, and attached to a nearby wall. Since the abbey entrance in the east range was wholly inadequate, a monumental new entrance portico with attached champagne bar and roof terrace was added to the west end of the north range. A large marquee-style hall to serve as an events venue was attached to the Old House, and both of these additions were deliberately done in a style giving great contrast to the original buildings. The hotel was opened in 2015.

In 2017, the hotel was sold to Hand Picked Hotels, which continued the conversion of cells to bedrooms in the north range and fitted out the former refectory as a fine-dining restaurant. in 2020 there were seventy bedrooms.

List of Superiors
Previous superiors include (in alphabetical order of surname): 
 Dame Gertrude d'Aurillac Dubois 1872-97 (Oversaw erection of conventual buildings at Stanbrook)
 Dame Clementia Cary
 Dame Barbara Constable
 Dame Catherine Gascoigne 1629-73 (First Abbess.)
 Dame Margaret Gascoigne
 Dame Frances Gawen 1623-9 (First superior, originally at Brussels. Prioress.)
 Dame Scholastica Gregson 1846-62 and 1868-72 (Oversaw erection of church.)
 Dame Cecilia A. Heywood
 Dame Joanna Jamieson
 Dame Laurentia McLachlan
 Dame Agnes More
 Dame Bridget More

Daughter Houses

Jamberoo Abbey
The first Roman Catholic archbishop of Sydney in Australia, John Bede Polding, had been taught by the nuns as a little boy. In 1849, he appealed to the abbey to provide nuns for a monastery that he was founding at Rydalmere, New South Wales, to be called Subiaco after the Italian location where St Benedict had begun monastic life. In response, Dame Magdalen le Clerc was sent to join Sister Scholastica Gregory from Princethorpe Priory (not of the English Benedictine Congregation, hence not a Dame), and the two founded what is now Jamberoo Abbey.

Abadia de Santa Maria, São Paulo
In 1907, a group of young women from São Paulo in Brazil entered the noviciate in order to become the founding community of the Abadia di Santa Maria in their city. This was founded in 1911, and itself became the mother-house of three other women's monasteries in Brazil as well as one in Argentina, Abadía de Santa Escolástica in Buenos Aires. From the latter are descended six monasteries: four in Argentina, one at Montevideo in Uruguay and one in Chile.

One of the Brazilian daughter houses, Abadia de Nossa Senhora das Graças in Belo Horizonte, has itself given rise to four further foundations in Brazil.

In popular culture
 Stanbrook Abbey was the model for Brede Abbey in Rumer Godden's 1969 novel, In This House of Brede.  Godden, who had asked the nuns of Stanbrook for prayers when her elder daughter was facing a risky pregnancy, gifted the Abbey a share of the copyright on the novel.
Iris Murdoch's novel The Bell is said to have been partly inspired by Stanbrook Abbey.
 Irish folk singer and Celtic harpist Mary O'Hara spent twelve years as a nun at Stanbrook Abbey.
The pseudonym "Benedictine of Stanbrook" was used by Werburg Welch for a number of pieces of art.

Publications
 
  Meinrad Craighead. The Mother's Birds: Images for a Death and a Birth. Worcester: Stanbrook Abbey Press, 1976.

See also 
 List of abbeys and priories

Notes

References
 
 
 
 Full account from contemporary sources of the early history of the community and the sufferings of the nuns in Cambrai, from Miscellanea VIII, (Publications of the Catholic Records Society, 1911-12, vol. XIII)

External links

 Stanbrook Abbey site
 Friends of Stanbrook Abbey
 Feilden Clegg Bradley article on the design and construction of the new abbey
 Stanbrook Abbey Hotel
 Stanbrook Abbey collection, at the University of Maryland libraries.

1625 establishments in England
Religious organizations established in 1625
Monasteries in Worcestershire
Benedictine monasteries in England
Organisations based in Worcestershire
Small press publishing companies
Christian monasteries established in the 17th century
Monasteries in North Yorkshire
Monasteries of the English Benedictine Congregation
Gothic Revival architecture in Worcestershire
E. W. Pugin church buildings